Let There Be Peace on Earth is the first Christmas album from American country music artist Vince Gill. It was released in 1993 on MCA Nashville. "Have Yourself a Merry Little Christmas," one of the album's tracks, peaked at #54 on the Billboard Hot Country Singles & Tracks chart.

Though panned by music critics, the album had broad appeal to the public. It reached No. 1 on the U.S. Billboard Top Holiday Albums for 1993, eventually going Platinum. The album had sold 1,787,000 copies as of December 2012.

Track listing

Personnel 
As listed in liner notes.
 Vince Gill – lead vocals, acoustic guitar, electric guitar
 John Barlow Jarvis – acoustic piano, Yamaha DX7, synthesizers
 Shane Keister – acoustic piano, Hammond B3 organ, synthesizers
 Steve Gibson – acoustic guitar, electric guitar
 Dean Parks – acoustic guitar, electric guitar
 John Hughey – steel guitar
 Leland Sklar – bass 
 Carlos Vega – drums
 Tom Roady – percussion
 Stuart Duncan – fiddle
 Charlie McCoy – harmonica, mouth harp
 Marty Paich – string arrangements, vocal arrangements 
 Bob Bailey – backing vocals
 Kim Fleming – backing vocals
 Jenny Gill – lead vocals on "Let There Be Peace on Earth"
 Donna McElroy – backing vocals
 Jamie Robbins – backing vocals
 Chris Rodriguez – backing vocals
 Additional backing vocals by the Gene Merlino Singers: Gene Merlino, John Bahler, Dick Bolks, Sally Stevens, Myrna Matthews, Melissa Mackay, Bobbi Page and Amick Byram.

Production 
 Tony Brown – producer 
 John Guess – recording, mixing, mastering 
 Derek Bason – second engineer 
 Robert Charles – second engineer 
 Marty Williams – second engineer, overdub recording 
 Glenn Meadows – mastering 
 Jessie Noble – project coordinator 
 Jim Kemp – art direction, design 
 Victoria Pearson – art direction, design, photography

Charts

Weekly charts

Year-end charts

Notes

Vince Gill albums
MCA Records albums
Albums produced by Tony Brown (record producer)
Albums arranged by Marty Paich
Christmas albums by American artists
1993 Christmas albums
Country Christmas albums